Scrubbing may refer to:

 Amine scrubbing
 Carbon dioxide scrubbing (disambiguation)
 Data scrubbing
 Memory scrubbing
 Scrubbing (audio)
 Scrubbing Bubbles

See also
 Scrub (disambiguation)
 Scrubber, a group of air pollution control devices
 Scrubbing In, American reality television series